Peter Schiller may refer to:

 Peter Schiller (ice hockey), German ice hockey player
 Peter Schiller (neuroscientist), American neuroscientist